Indjapyx is a genus of diplurans in the family Japygidae.

Species
 Indjapyx agathis Pagés, 2002
 Indjapyx annandalei Silvestri, 1931
 Indjapyx bakeri (Silvestri, 1928)
 Indjapyx besucheti Pagés, 1984
 Indjapyx bogorensis Pagés, 2002
 Indjapyx ceylonicus Silvestri, 1931
 Indjapyx crockerianus Pagés, 1994
 Indjapyx duporti (Silvestri, 1928)
 Indjapyx goodenoughensis Womersley, 1945
 Indjapyx gravelyi Silvestri, 1931
 Indjapyx harrisoni Silvestri, 1936
 Indjapyx heteronotus Silvestri, 1931
 Indjapyx indicus (Oudemans, 1891)
 Indjapyx kraepelini Silvestri, 1930
 Indjapyx loebli Pagés, 1984
 Indjapyx mussardi Pagés, 1984
 Indjapyx novaecaledoniae Silvestri, 1948
 Indjapyx perturbator Pagés, 1978
 Indjapyx petrunkevitchi Silvestri, 1936
 Indjapyx pinicola Pagés, 2002
 Indjapyx polettii (Silvestri, 1928)
 Indjapyx pruthii Silvestri, 1931
 Indjapyx samosir Pagés, 2002
 Indjapyx seymourii Silvestri, 1931
 Indjapyx sharpi (Silvestri, 1904)
 Indjapyx silvestrii Pagés, 1984
 Indjapyx simalungun Pagés, 2002
 Indjapyx singapura Pagés, 2002
 Indjapyx sumatranus (Silvestri, 1916)
 Indjapyx taprobanicus Silvestri, 1931
 Indjapyx uvianus Pagés, 1984
 Indjapyx vadoni Pagés, 1955
 Indjapyx yoshii Pagés, 1994

References

Diplura